The 2023 West Coast Conference women's basketball Tournament is the postseason women's basketball tournament for the West Coast Conference for the 2022–23 season. All tournament games will be played at Orleans Arena in the Las Vegas-area community of Paradise, Nevada, from March 2–7, 2023.

Seeds
All ten conference teams participate in the tournament. Teams are seeded by record within the conference, with a tiebreaker system to seed teams with identical conference records. The tiebreakers operate in the following order:
 Head-to-head record
 Record against the top-seeded team not involved in the tie, going down through the standings until the tie is broken
 NET rating after the final regular-season conference games on February 25

Schedule and results

Bracket 

* denotes overtime period

See also

References

West Coast Conference women's basketball tournament
2022–23 West Coast Conference women's basketball season
West Coast Conference women's basketball tournament
West Coast Conference women's basketball tournament
Women's sports in Nevada
College basketball tournaments in Nevada
College sports tournaments in Nevada